Nigel Esme Haig  (12 December 1887 – 27 October 1966) was a first-class cricketer who played for Middlesex and England.

Tall, stringy and deceptively frail in appearance, Haig played regularly from 1912 to 1934 as an amateur batsman who could open the innings or bat further down the order and as a tireless swing bowler somewhat above medium pace. His all-round usefulness is shown by the fact that he made 1,000 runs in a season six times and took 100 wickets five times. He did the all-rounder's double of 1,000 runs and 100 wickets in a season three times, in 1921, 1927 and 1929. He was captain of Middlesex for six seasons from 1929, sharing the job in the last two years with H. J. Enthoven.

Haig's Test match career was undistinguished. He was brought into the England team, like so many others, for just one match and then discarded in the 1921 series against the all-conquering Australians under Warwick Armstrong. Eight years later, in 1929–30, he was a member of Freddie Calthorpe's team that played the first four Tests in the West Indies.

Haig was a nephew of Lord Harris and an all-round sportsman, good at ice hockey, real tennis, lawn tennis, rackets, soccer, rugby union and golf. During the First World War, while serving with the Royal Field Artillery, Haig was awarded the Military Cross in the 1917 Birthday Honours.

Ian Peebles, who played under Haig at Middlesex, said of him: "He had a witty and active mind, with interests ranging from bird watching to music and poetry. He was a wonderful companion and guide to us youngsters, and he had a hot Scots temper which kept us, very properly, in some awe of him."

References

External links

1887 births
1966 deaths
Sportspeople from Kensington
Cricketers from Greater London
People educated at Eton College
England Test cricketers
English cricketers
Middlesex cricket captains
England cricket team selectors
Free Foresters cricketers
Marylebone Cricket Club cricketers
Gentlemen cricketers
North v South cricketers
Gentlemen of the South cricketers
British Army cricketers
Army and Navy cricketers
British Army personnel of World War I
Recipients of the Military Cross
English cricketers of 1919 to 1945
H. D. G. Leveson Gower's XI cricketers
Lord Hawke's XI cricketers
C. I. Thornton's XI cricketers
Middlesex cricketers
Military personnel from London